The discography of German Eurodisco group Silver Convention consists of 5 studio albums, 5 compilation albums, and 19 released singles.

Albums

Studio albums

Compilation albums

Singles

Notes

References

Discographies of German artists
Disco discographies